Siegfried Gottlieb Aikman (born 28 April 1959) is a Dutch field hockey coach of the Pakistan national team.

He managed the Japanese team at the 2020 Summer Olympics. In December 2021, Aikman was named head coach of the Pakistan national hockey team.

References

External links
Tokyo 2020 profile

1959 births
Living people
Dutch expatriate sportspeople in Japan
Dutch field hockey coaches
Olympic coaches
Dutch expatriate sportspeople in Pakistan